Thierry Tribondeau (born 15 April 1962 in Ringe, Denmark) is a French bobsledder who competed in the early 1990s. Competing in two Winter Olympics, he earned his best finish of eighth in the four-man event at Albertville in 1992. He was born in Denmark to French refugees.

Prior to being in bobsleigh, Tibondeau was involved in track and field, being twice national champion in the 200 metres sprints in the late 1980s.

References
 1992 bobsleigh four-man results
 1994 bobsleigh four-man results
 Involvement with French skeleton racer Philippe Cavoret's career 

1962 births
Bobsledders at the 1992 Winter Olympics
Bobsledders at the 1994 Winter Olympics
French male sprinters
French male bobsledders
Olympic bobsledders of France
Living people
People from Faaborg-Midtfyn Municipality
Danish people of French descent
French emigrants to Denmark